The 1901 New South Wales rugby union tour of New Zealand was a series of matches played in August–September 1901 in New Zealand by New South Wales rugby union.

Results

References
 RUGBY FOOTBALL. WELLINGTON, Sunday. , The Argus 19/8/1901
 NEW SOUTH WALES FOOTBALLERS IN NEW ZEALAND. WELLINGTON, The Brisbane Courier 22/8/1901
 THE NEW SOUTH WALES FOOTBALLERS., The Brisbane Courier 26/8/1901
 THE NEW SOUTH WALES FOOTBALLERS., Examiner (Launceston, 29/8/1901)
 NEW SOUTH WALES V. NEW ZEALAND, The Brisbane Courier 2/9/1901
 NEW ZEALAND. WELLINGTON, SEPTEMBER 3. THE NEW SOUTH WALES FOOTBALLERS. , The Brisbane Courier 5/9/1901
 FOOTBALL. AUCKLAND, Monday , Examiner (Launceston,  10/9/1901

Note

New South Wales
Waratahs
New South Wales rugby union team tours
Rugby union tours of New Zealand
Tour